KBZQ (99.5 FM, "The Breeze 99.5") is a radio station broadcasting an adult contemporary music format. Licensed to Lawton, Oklahoma, United States, the station serves the greater Lawton area. The station is currently owned by Chad Fox, through licensee Local Radio, L.L.C. Studios are located on Lee Boulevard in Lawton, and the transmitter is located southwest of the city.

History
The station was granted a construction permit on September 7, 1982, and was assigned the call letters KMGZ on October 28, 1982. It received its license to cover on February 10, 1984. On June 5, 1992, the station changed its call sign to KMVE, and on June 10, 1992, to the current KBZQ.

References

External links

BZQ
Mainstream adult contemporary radio stations in the United States
Radio stations established in 1982
1982 establishments in Oklahoma